Emek Hahula Comprehensive High School is located in Kfar Blum in the Upper Galilee region of Israel.

Emek HaHula Comprehensive High School caters to over 1,000 students, grades 7–12. The school is situated in the Upper Galilee region, one of the most picturesque places in Israel. The school provides advanced education for high-achievers, while also providing additional help for students with severe learning disabilities and autistic children. It is one of Israel's leading establishments for physical education – many of Israel's leading basketball players started their career at this school.

Notable alumni

 Tom Maayan (born 1993), Israeli basketball player in the Israeli National League

Educational institutions with year of establishment missing
High schools in Israel
Upper Galilee Regional Council